, (September 23, 1919 – February 20, 2018) was a Japanese writer.

Kaneko was born in Chichibu. He studied at the University of Tokyo and worked for the Bank of Japan. 

Kaneko died in Kumagaya on February 20, 2018, of Acute respiratory distress syndrome in Kumagaya, Saitama at the age of 98.

Prizes
2005 : Cikada Prize
2008 : Person of Cultural Merit
2010 : Kikuchi Kan Prize
2015 : Asahi Prize

Bibliography 
 Kaneko Tohta: With Notes and Commentary Part 2: 1961-2012: Selected Haiku, Parte 2;Partes 1961-2012, 
 Kaneko Tohta. In: World Kigu Database - Introducing Haiku Poets, Famous People, Places and Haiku Topics.
 Kaneko Tōta. In: J. Thomas Rimer, Van C. Gessel: The Columbia Anthology of Modern Japanese Literature: From 1945 to the present. Columbia University Press, 2007, p. 444.
 William J. Higginson, Penny Harter: The Haiku Handbook: How to Write, Share, and Teach Haiku. Kodansha International, 1989, p.|41–42.

References

1919 births
2018 deaths
Japanese writers
University of Tokyo alumni
Japanese haiku poets
Writers from Saitama Prefecture
Deaths from respiratory failure